Beyglu (also Romanized as Beyglū and Bayglū; also known as Baygehlū) is a village in Shurakat-e Jonubi Rural District, Ilkhchi District, Osku County, East Azerbaijan Province, Iran. At the 2006 census, its population was 394, in 123 families.

References 

Populated places in Osku County